The A73 motorway (Dutch: Rijksweg 73) is a motorway in the Netherlands. It is 106 kilometers in length and connects the A50 at the Ewijk interchange in Beuningen through Venlo and Roermond to the Het Vonderen interchange with the A2 in Maasbracht.

For its entire route, the A73 follows the path of the Meuse river, thereby opening up north and central Limburg to traffic.

External links
 Autosnelwegen.net

Motorways in the Netherlands
Motorways in Gelderland
Motorways in Limburg (Netherlands)
Motorways in North Brabant